Chaman Bid (also Romanized as Chaman Bīd; also known as Chaman Bīd-e Rīg) is a village in Rig Rural District, in the Central District of Lordegan County, Chaharmahal and Bakhtiari Province, Iran. At the 2006 census, its population was 653, in 127 families.

References 

Populated places in Lordegan County